Olı Räs is a rural locality (a derevnya) in Biektaw District, Tatarstan. The population was 11 as of 2010.
Olı Räs is located 28 km northwest of Biektaw, district's administrative centre, and 56 km north of Qazan, republic's capital, by road.

The earliest known record of the settlement dates from the 18th century. It forms part of the district since 1965.

There is 1 street in the village.

References

External links 
 

Rural localities in Vysokogorsky District